Jacksonport is a town in Door County, Wisconsin, United States. The population was 738 at the 2000 census. The unincorporated communities of Jacksonport and West Jacksonport are located in the town. Part of Clark Lake is in the Town of Jacksonport.

Geography

According to the United States Census Bureau, the town has a total area of 58.3 square miles (151.0 km2), of which, 29.0 square miles (75.2 km2) of it is land and 29.3 square miles (75.8 km2) of it (50.19%) is water.

At what is now Jacksonport was once a Potawatomi village called Medemoya-Seebe, or "old woman's creek".

Lost Lake is located in northwestern Jacksonport. The lake is open to the public, but can only be accessed through Logan Creek.

Climate

Demographics
As of the census of 2000, there were 738 people, 304 households, and 216 families residing in the town. The population density was 25.4 people per square mile (9.8/km2). There were 638 housing units at an average density of 22.0 per square mile (8.5/km2). The racial makeup of the town was 97.43% White, 0.95% Asian, 0.54% from other races, and 1.08% from two or more races. Hispanic or Latino of any race were 1.49% of the population.

There were 304 households, out of which 26.3% had children under the age of 18 living with them, 63.2% were married couples living together, 4.9% had a female householder with no husband present, and 28.9% were non-families. 23.7% of all households were made up of individuals, and 9.9% had someone living alone who was 65 years of age or older. The average household size was 2.43 and the average family size was 2.91.

In the town, the population was spread out, with 23.4% under the age of 18, 4.2% from 18 to 24, 25.3% from 25 to 44, 29.5% from 45 to 64, and 17.5% who were 65 years of age or older. The median age was 43 years. For every 100 females, there were 110.3 males. For every 100 females age 18 and over, there were 102.5 males.

The median income for a household in the town was $42,404, and the median income for a family was $46,912. Males had a median income of $30,795 versus $19,926 for females. The per capita income for the town was $20,493. About 3.2% of families and 3.4% of the population were below the poverty line, including 1.9% of those under age 18 and 1.5% of those age 65 or over.

Notable people

 Charles Reynolds, Wisconsin State Representative
 Thomas Reynolds, Wisconsin State Representative

Gallery

References

External links
Jacksonport Historical Society

Towns in Door County, Wisconsin
Towns in Wisconsin